The Piano is the twenty-sixth album by Herbie Hancock.

About the Album
As with Directstep (recorded one week previously), this album was recorded, and originally only released, in Japan.  It was one of Hancock's most successful albums in Japan, perhaps because it was entirely solo piano. Hancock tackles jazz standards such as "My Funny Valentine", "On Green Dolphin Street" and "Some Day My Prince Will Come" while also performing four original compositions.

This album was initially released exclusively in Japan and first issued there on CD in 1983. In 2004, over 25 years after its recording, the album was released with four additional alternate takes of the same session. It was the first and only (until 2014) of Hancock's Japanese releases available internationally.

Track listing
CBS/Sony – 30AP 1033

Personnel
 Herbie Hancock – acoustic piano

Production credits
 David Rubinson – producer
 Fred Catero – engineer, mixing
 Mikio Takamatsu – mastering
 Yasohachi "88" Itoh and Keiichi Nakamura – production coordination
 Yusaku Nakanishi – art direction
 Kazumi Kurigami – cover photo
 Akira Aimi – photography

References

1979 albums
Herbie Hancock albums
Columbia Records albums
Albums produced by Dave Rubinson
Solo piano jazz albums